The Turkey Billie Jean King Cup team represents Turkey in the Billie Jean King Cup tennis competition and are governed by the Türkiye Tenis Federasyonu.  They currently compete in the Europe/Africa Zone of Group III.

History
Turkey competed in its first Fed Cup in 1991.  Their best result was reaching the final qualifying round in 1993.

Players

See also
Fed Cup
Turkey Davis Cup team

External links

Billie Jean King Cup teams
Fed Cup
Tennis